The Honiara Botanic Gardens are located in Rove, Honiara, Solomon Islands. Garden Drive meanders around the prison complex and is just past the Solomon Islands Broadcasting buildings.

The Rove Botanical Gardens is located immediately behind the Rove Prison. Once a showpiece of Whitmore's collection and Geoff Dennis gardening the gardens deteriorated in the 1980s. Following a publication by C.P Henderson and I.R Hancock in 1988, a New Zealand volunteer David Glenny, Geoff Dennis, and Myknee Qusa Sirikolo rehabilitated the collections in 1990.

References

External links

Honiara
Botanical gardens